In physics a free field is a field without interactions, which is described by the terms of motion and mass.

Description 

In classical physics, a free field is a field whose equations of motion are given by linear partial differential equations. Such linear PDE's have a unique solution for a given initial condition.

In quantum field theory, an operator valued distribution is a free field if it satisfies some linear partial differential equations such that the corresponding case of the same linear PDEs for a classical field (i.e. not an operator) would be the Euler–Lagrange equation for some quadratic Lagrangian. We can differentiate distributions by defining their derivatives via differentiated test functions. See Schwartz distribution for more details. Since we are dealing not with ordinary distributions but operator valued distributions, it is understood these PDEs aren't constraints on states but instead a description of the relations among the smeared fields. Beside the PDEs, the operators also satisfy another relation, the commutation/anticommutation relations.

Canonical Commutation Relation 
Basically, commutator (for bosons)/anticommutator (for fermions) of two smeared fields is i times the Peierls bracket of the field with itself (which is really a distribution, not a function) for the PDEs smeared over both test functions. This has the form of a CCR/CAR algebra.

CCR/CAR algebras with infinitely many degrees of freedom have many inequivalent irreducible unitary representations. If the theory is defined over Minkowski space, we may choose the unitary irrep containing a vacuum state although that isn't always necessary.

Example
Let φ be an operator valued distribution and the (Klein–Gordon) PDE be

.

This is a bosonic field. Let's call the distribution given by the Peierls bracket Δ.

Then,

where here, φ is a classical field and {,} is the Peierls bracket.
 
Then, the canonical commutation relation is

.

Note that Δ is a distribution over two arguments, and so, can be smeared as well.

Equivalently, we could have insisted that

where  is the time ordering operator and that if the supports of f and g are spacelike separated,

.

See also 
Normal order
Wick's theorem

References 
 Michael E. Peskin and Daniel V. Schroeder, An Introduction to Quantum Field Theory, Addison-Wesley, Reading, 1995. p19-p29

Quantum field theory